Sergil and the Dictator (French: Sergil et le dictateur) is a 1948 French thriller film directed by Jacques Daroy and starring Paul Meurisse, Liliane Bert and Arlette Merry. It is the sequel to the 1947 hit Inspector Sergil. The final part of the trilogy Sergil Amongst the Girls followed in 1952.

Location filming took place around Marseilles and at the city's film studios.

Synopsis
When a foreign dictator visits France, Inspector Sergil is ordered to protect him from his many enemies.

Cast
 Paul Meurisse as L'inspecteur Sergil
 Liliane Bert as Bijou
 Arlette Merry as Dolorès
 Gaby Bruyère as Colette Marly
 Jérôme Goulven as Monnier
 René Blancard as Goujon
 Henri Arius as Ricardo Mendes
 Christiane Sertilange as Maud Gloria
 Jacqueline Huet as La bonne
 Mag-Avril as La logeuse
 Pierre Clarel as Roberillon
 Marcel Vallée as le Patron 
 Georges Yvon as Durban
 Paul Préboist

References

Bibliography 
 Rège, Philippe. Encyclopedia of French Film Directors, Volume 1. Scarecrow Press, 2009.

External links 
 

1948 films
French thriller films
1940s thriller films
1940s French-language films
Films directed by Jacques Daroy
Marseille Studios films
Films set in Marseille
French black-and-white films
1940s French films